"All Systems Go" is the third single from American singer-songwriter Donna Summer's thirteenth album of the same name (1987). Edited from its original album version, it became a minor hit in the United Kingdom, where it reached #54 on the UK Singles Chart.

Critical reception
Jerry Smith from Music Week wrote, "Nowhere near as compulsive as her "Dinner with Gershwin" hit, but this, the title track from her latest album, written and produced by Harold Faltermeyer, does have a certain naggingly quality to it." Tom Hibbert from Smash Hits constated that "this woman can sing like a dream", commenting further that "this may not be her finest moment (that was "State of Independence", the greatest record ever made) but it's completely fab nonetheless, a crisp and swinging pop tune with admirably absurd references to outer space. Bravo, as they say, madam."

Track listing
 7" single
A. "All Systems Go" (Edit) - 3:50
B. "Bad Reputation" - 4:22

 12" single
A. "All Systems Go" (Extended Remix) - 8:03
B1. "All Systems Go" (Edit) - 3:50
B2. "Bad Reputation" - 4:22

Charts

Personnel
 Donna Summer - Vocals
 Harold Faltermeyer - Producer, Keyboards, Programming, Mixing
 Wesley Plas - Guitar
 Brian Reeves, Dave Concors, Wesley Plas, Pit Floss - Engineering
 Uli Rudolf - Mixing
 Tony Viramontes - Single cover photography

References

1987 songs
1988 singles
Donna Summer songs
Songs written by Harold Faltermeyer
Songs written by Donna Summer
Song recordings produced by Harold Faltermeyer
Geffen Records singles
Warner Records singles